The men's team foil was one of eight fencing events on the fencing at the 1964 Summer Olympics programme. It was the eleventh appearance of the event. The competition was held on October 15 – 16 1964. 78 fencers from 16 nations competed.

Results

Round 1
Ties between teams were broken by individual victories (in parentheses), then by touches received.

Championship rounds

Fifth place semifinal

Rosters

Argentina
 Adolfo Bisellach
 Jesús Taboada
 Alberto Lanteri
 Orlando Nannini
 Félix Galimi

Australia
 Gerard Tubier
 David McKenzie
 John Douglas
 Brian McCowage
 Ivan Lund

Colombia
 Ignacio Posada
 Dibier Tamayo
 Emilio Echeverry
 Ernesto Sastre
 Humberto Posada

Egypt
 Moustafa Soheim
 Farid El-Ashmawi
 Ahmed El-Hamy El-Husseini
 Mohamed Gamil El-Kalyoubi
 Sameh Abdel Rahman

France
 Jean-Claude Magnan
 Daniel Revenu
 Jacky Courtillat
 Pierre Rodocanachi
 Christian Noël

Great Britain
 Bill Hoskyns
 Allan Jay
 Sandy Leckie
 Ralph Cooperman
 Derrick Cawthorne

Germany
 Jürgen Brecht
 Dieter Wellmann
 Eberhard Mehl
 Tim Gerresheim
 Jürgen Theuerkauff

Hungary
 Jenő Kamuti
 László Kamuti
 József Gyuricza
 Sándor Szabó
 Béla Gyarmati

Iran
 Houshmand Almasi
 Nasser Madani
 Shahpour Zarnegar
 Bizhan Zarnegar

Italy
 Gianguido Milanesi
 Pasquale La Ragione
 Arcangelo Pinelli
 Nicola Granieri
 Mario Curletto

Japan
 Kazuhiko Tabuchi
 Fujio Shimizu
 Kazuo Mano
 Heizaburo Okawa
 Sosuke Toda

Poland
 Zbigniew Skrudlik
 Witold Woyda
 Egon Franke
 Ryszard Parulski
 Jan Różycki

Romania
 Tănase Mureșanu
 Ion Drîmbă
 Iuliu Falb
 Ștefan Haukler
 Attila Csipler

South Korea
 Sin Du-Ho
 Han Myeong-Seok
 Kim Man-Sig
 Kim Chang-Hwan

Soviet Union
 Viktor Zhdanovich
 Yury Sisikin
 Mark Midler
 German Sveshnikov
 Yury Sharov

United States
 Larry Anastasi
 Eugene Glazer
 Herbert Cohen
 Albie Axelrod
 Ed Richards

References

Sources
 

Fencing at the 1964 Summer Olympics
Men's events at the 1964 Summer Olympics